The Speedway Great Britain (SGB) Championship is the second division of speedway league competition in the United Kingdom, governed by the Speedway Control Bureau (SCB), in conjunction with the British Speedway Promoters' Association (BSPA).  It was introduced for 2017 following a restructuring of British speedway.

Teams

Current teams

 Berwick Bandits
 Birmingham Brummies
 Edinburgh Monarchs

 Glasgow Tigers
 Oxford Cheetahs
 Plymouth Gladiators

 Poole Pirates
 Redcar Bears
 Scunthorpe Scorpions

Former teams
 Eastbourne Eagles (2019-2021)
 Ipswich Witches (2017-2018)
 Kent Kings (2021)
 Leicester Lions (2019-2022)
 Newcastle Diamonds (until 2022)
 Peterborough Panthers (2017-2018)
 Sheffield Tigers (2017-2019)
 Workington Comets (2017-2018)

Champions

History

2017
The league contained ten teams who meet each other twice home and away. The top four teams at the end of the regular season go into playoffs to decide the champions.
Ten of the teams from the previous Premier League were in the Championship for 2017.
In 2017, there was a relegation and promotion race-off between the Championship and the new top tier, the SGB Premiership, with the bottom team from the Premiership going into a playoff with the Championship winners.

2018
The Lakeside Hammers opted to join the Championship after having competed in the National League in 2017. Each team met each other home and away only once. The top four teams at the end of the regular season went into playoffs to decide the champions.

2019
11 teams made up the 2019 league structure. Birmingham Brummies, Eastbourne Eagles, Leicester Lions and Somerset Rebels joined the Championship whilst Ipswich Witches and Peterborough Panthers moved up a level to the SGB Premiership. Workington Comets initially declared to run but then withdrew their intention.

2021
12 teams make up the 2021 league structure. The Plymouth Gladiators, Poole Pirates and Kent Kings joining the Championship. Whilst the Sheffield Tigers moved up to the SGB Premiership. Somerset Rebels announced that they won’t be taking part for the 2021 season, later announcing the closure of the club.

Teams
At the start of the season, teams are built up to maximum points limit. The combined Calculated Match Average (CMA) of the riders declared in the team must not be higher than an agreed figure set at the British Speedway Promoters' Association (BSPA) Annual General Meeting.

2017 teams 

 Berwick Bandits
 Edinburgh Monarchs
 Glasgow Tigers
 Ipswich Witches

 Newcastle Diamonds
 Peterborough Panthers
 Redcar Bears
 Scunthorpe Scorpions

 Sheffield Tigers
 Workington Comets

2018 teams 

 Berwick Bandits
 Edinburgh Monarchs
 Glasgow Tigers
 Ipswich Witches

 Lakeside Hammers
 Newcastle Diamonds
 Peterborough Panthers
 Redcar Bears

 Scunthorpe Scorpions
 Sheffield Tigers
 Workington Comets

2019 teams 

 Berwick Bandits
 Birmingham Brummies
 Eastbourne Eagles
 Edinburgh Monarchs

 Glasgow Tigers
 Leicester Lions
 Newcastle Diamonds
 Redcar Bears

 Scunthorpe Scorpions
 Sheffield Tigers
 Somerset Rebels

2021 teams 

 Berwick Bandits
 Birmingham Brummies
 Edinburgh Monarchs
 Glasgow Tigers

 Kent Kings
 Leicester Lions
 Newcastle Diamonds
 Plymouth Gladiators

 Poole Pirates
 Redcar Bears
 Scunthorpe Scorpions
The Eastbourne Eagles withdrew mid-season.

2022 teams 

 Berwick Bandits
 Birmingham Brummies
 Eastbourne Eagles
 Edinburgh Monarchs

 Glasgow Tigers
 Leicester Lions
 Oxford Cheetahs
 Plymouth Gladiators

 Poole Pirates
 Redcar Bears
 Scunthorpe Scorpions
The Newcastle Diamonds withdrew mid-season.

See also
SGB Premiership
List of United Kingdom Speedway League Champions

References

External links
Official BSPA (British Speedway Promoters Association) Homepage

 
Speedway leagues
SBG Championship
Sports leagues established in 2017
2017 establishments in the United Kingdom